The 2015 Adrian Flux British FIM Speedway Grand Prix was the fourth race of the 2015 Speedway Grand Prix season. It took place on 4 July at the Millennium Stadium in Cardiff, Wales.

Riders 
First reserve Peter Kildemand replaced Jarosław Hampel, who had injured himself during the 2015 Speedway World Cup. The Speedway Grand Prix Commission also nominated Craig Cook as the wild card, and Jason Garrity and Robert Lambert both as Track Reserves.

Results 
The Grand Prix was won by Niels-Kristian Iversen, who beat Chris Holder, Peter Kildemand and Tai Woffinden in the final. Holder had initially top scored with 13 points during the qualifying rides, however Iversen passed him on the first bend of the final and stayed ahead to claim his first British Speedway Grand Prix victory. Despite finishing fourth, Woffinden extended his lead over Nicki Pedersen to 12 points in the race for the world title.

Heat details

The intermediate classification

References

See also 
 motorcycle speedway

2015 Speedway Grand Prix
Speedway Grand Prix
Speedway Grand Prix
Speedway Grand Prix of Great Britain